Charles VII or Carl (Swedish: Karl Sverkersson; c. 1130 – 12 April 1167) was ruler of Götaland, and then King of Sweden from c. 1161 to 1167, when he was assassinated in a military attack by  Knut Eriksson who succeeded him as Canute I.

He is the first historically known king of Sweden by the name of Charles, but use of the ordinal VII is widespread.

Pretender to the throne
Charles was the son of Sverker I, who was assassinated in December 1156. A pretender from another family, Eric IX (whom later generations dubbed martyr and saint), ruled over parts of Sweden in the following years. However, Charles was chosen king by the people of Östergötland in c. 1158, apparently in opposition to Eric. A letter from pope Hadrianus IV (d. 1159) knows him as ruler of regnum Gothorum although Eric is known to have held power in Västergötland. It is claimed in a late medieval chronicle that Eric's murder by minions of their rival Magnus Henriksson in 1160 was also backed by Charles.

Magnus Henriksson had a brief reign after killing Eric, but was himself killed by Charles in 1161 in a battle in Örebro. After the fall of Magnus, Charles received general recognition in Sweden as king. In fact he is the first Swedish ruler to be expressly titled rex Sweorum et Gothorum (King of the Swedes and Götar) in a papal letter from 1164.

Reign
The brief reign of Charles is important from a number of aspects. The early medieval Swedish kingdom resembled a network of shifting aristocratic alliances rather than a state, but during the second half of the 12th century it slowly began to converge with the Catholic-European state model. It was during his time that the Archbishop of Uppsala was established, although Sweden was still ecclesiastically subordinated to the Danish archbishop in Lund. After a request by the king, his jarl Ulf, and the Swedish bishops, the pope appointed Stefan, a former monk in Alvastra Abbey, as the first archbishop. Shortly afterwards, the people of Värend at the border to Denmark offered money to the king if he supported the installation of a particular bishop in Växjö. Charles is also known to have donated land and privileges to Vreta Abbey and Nydala Abbey. The donations suggest that his main interests lay in the provinces of Östergötland and Småland, while the provinces around Lake Mälaren may have been supervised by Ulf Jarl. The first known non-epigraphic document was issued in his time, which also contains the earliest known royal seal.

Swedish relations with the Russian lands had been quite good up to the early 12th century. However, this changed into a state of intermittent hostility during the 12th century. The chronicles of Novgorod relate a sea-borne Swedish invasion in 1164. The invading forces attacked Ladoga, which however received Novgorodian relief forces after five days. The Swedes were thoroughly beaten outside Ladoga on 28 May and lost 43 out of 55 boats. The remnants withdrew.

Assassination
In the spring of 1167, King Charles was killed on the island of Visingsö by supporters of Knut Eriksson, head of the rival Eric dynasty. "But his son Sverker was carried to Denmark in the lap, and his journey was miserable." Knut usurped the throne. Charles was buried in Alvastra monastery. Like the other kings of the House of Sverker, he is lauded by the short chronicle in the Law of Västergötland: "He owed his dignity to his good father. He ruled Sweden with wisdom and goodness."

Starting from Charles' death, his kinsmen (half-brothers or possibly nephews) Burislev and Kol together opposed Canute's kingship and were rival kings, recognized in some Gothic parts of Sweden; but the last of them was killed in about 1172–1173, after which Canute's government got recognized overall.

Family 
Charles' wife was Christina Hvide, a Danish lady, daughter of Stig Hvitaleder, a Seelander magnate, and his wife who was sister of Valdemar I of Denmark.

Their sole historically attested child was Sverker Karlsson, a young boy when Charles died, and who later was elected King Sverker II of Sweden (1195–1208/10) after the death of Charles's rival king Canute I.

References

Citations

Sources 
 Gillingstam, Hans, "Karl Sverkersson", Svenskt biografiskt lexikon 
 Larsson, Mats G., Götarnas riken; Upptäcktsfärder till Sveriges enande. Stockholm: Atlantis, 2002.
 
 Sawyer, Peter, När Sverige blev Sverige. Alingsås: Viktoria Bokförlag, 1991.
 Sundberg, Ulf, Medeltidens svenska krig. Stockholm: Hjalmarson & Högberg, 1999.

External links

1130s births
1167 deaths

Year of birth uncertain
12th-century Swedish monarchs
Rulers of Finland
12th-century murdered monarchs
Assassinated Swedish people
Kings of the Geats
12th-century Swedish people
Swedish jarls
Sons of kings